Cementerio del Cerro is a cemetery in Montevideo, Uruguay.

It is located in the barrio of Villa del Cerro, behind the Fortress. It was established in 1868.

References

External links
 Cementerio del Cerro – data
 Cementerio del Cerro

Cemeteries in Montevideo
1868 establishments in Uruguay
Villa del Cerro